Dorokha Gewog, now called Dophuchen Geog, is a gewog (village block) of Samtse District, Bhutan. Dorokha Gewog is part of Dorokha Dungkhag (sub-district), which comprise Dorokha and Denchukha Gewogs.

The people here speak Lhotshamkha and are predominantly Hindus.  It is connected with road from Samtse town, Phuntsholing, and Haa via Tergola. The nearest town, and district headquarters, is Samtse, about 3 hours driven from the Drungkhag.

The road newtworks connect most of the remote parts of the Geog, including Sengdhyen, a Doya or Lhop community.

References 

Armington, S. (2002) Bhutan. (2nd ed.) Melbourne: Lonely Planet.

Former gewogs of Bhutan
Samtse District